The McKell Institute is an Australian public policy institute dedicated to developing practical policy ideas and contributing to public debate.

History
The McKell Institute was launched in April 2012. It is named after William McKell, the 27th Premier of New South Wales and 12th Governor-General of Australia.

Research
The McKell Institute released its first report in 2012 titled Homes for All: The 40 things we can do to improve supply and affordability.

The Institute conducts an annual survey, The State of New South Wales, which charts the views of NSW residents on a range of social and economic issues.

The Institute released a major report on productivity in November 2012 - Understanding Productivity - Australia's Choice

In July 2013 the McKell Institute released a report around work/life balance titled The Case for a National Portable Long Service Leave Scheme

Most recently, the McKell Institute was commissioned by Vodafone Hutchison Australia to compile Superfast Broadband - The future is in your hands, a report on telecommunications infrastructure and the National Broadband Network

Events
The McKell Institute hosts a range of special guest speakers from business, government and civil society who address the Institute on policy matters.

Guest speakers who addressed the Institute in 2012 include the Australian Prime Minister, Julia Gillard, who delivered a speech entitled 'Great Reforms Endure' and the Chair of Infrastructure New South Wales, former NSW Premier, Nick Greiner, who discussed the recently released NSW 20 year State Infrastructure Strategy First Things First.

In 2013, special guests have included NSW Education Minister the Hon Adrian Piccoli MP, NSW Treasurer the Hon Mike Baird MP, Federal Finance Minister Senator the Hon Penny Wong and Federal Health Minister the Hon Tanya Plibersek.

Subsequently, The McKell Institute has hosted numerous international and domestic public figures, including Former US Congressman Barney Frank, Former Italian Prime Minister Enrico Letta, former Barack Obama campaign advisor David Plouffe, Australian Federal Opposition Leader Bill Shorten, as well as other senior Australian political leaders.

References

External links

Think tanks based in Australia
2012 establishments in Australia